Scopula cajanderi is a moth of the family Geometridae. It has a Holarctic, distribution, which includes Russia, Alaska and Yukon.

Adults have dark grey to reddish brown wings.

References

Moths described in 1903
Moths of North America
Moths of Asia
cajanderi